Dieter "Maschine" Birr (born 18 March 1944 in Köslin, Pommern, Germany) is a German singer, guitarist and composer. He was a longtime member of the rock band Puhdys, which dissolved in 2016.

Life and career 
Dieter Birr was trained as a grinder and at the same time taught himself how to play the guitar. From 1966 to 1972 he studied dance music, music theory and guitar at Musikschule Friedrichshain in East Berlin. Until 1969 he was a member of the bands Telestars, Luniks (including Fritz Puppel), Jupiters and Evgeni-Kantschew-Quintett. In 1969, he became frontman of the Puhdys, which became the most commercially successful rock band in GDR history. Birr composed around 250 songs for the band. He got his nickname "Maschine" after bandmate Peter Meyer described him as an "eating machine".

In 1974, Birr appeared in a supporting role in the DEFA film Elective Affinities.

In 1986, Amiga released his first solo album, Intim, which was not commercially successful. In the meantime, he was a lyricist for Dunja Rajter and the Wildecker Herzbuben, amongst others.

In his second solo album, Maschine, released in 2014, Julia Neigel, Wolfgang Niedecken and Toni Krahl also appeared as duet partners. The album contains some new additions to well-known Puhdys hits from the 1970s, including Geh zu ihr and Wenn ein Mensch lebt. Also in 2014, on his 70th birthday, Birr's autobiography Maschine – Die Biografie. was released.

In 2016, the third solo album Neubeginner was released after the end of the Puhdys. In 2017, he sang together with Romano on the song Karl May, which appeared on his album Copyshop. In 2019, he appeared at Lieder auf Banz with Julia Neigel.

Personal life 
Birr lives in Neuenhagen bei Berlin and has been married since 1979 in his second marriage. He has two children. His son Andy Birr is a vocalist, guitarist and drummer of the pop band Bell, Book & Candle.

Awards 
 1982: National Prize of the German Democratic Republic

Discography 
 1986: Intim (Amiga)
 2014: Maschine (Universal)
 2016: Neubeginner (Heart of Berlin)
 2018: Alle Winter wieder (Universal)

Autobiography 
 Maschine – Die Biografie. Zusammen mit Wolfgang Martin. Neues Leben, Berlin 2014, .

Literature 
 Rainer Bratfisch: Dieter Birr. In: Wer war wer in der DDR? 5. Ausgabe. Band 1, Ch. Links, Berlin 2010, .

External links 

 Offizielle Website
 „Ich wüsste gar nicht, was ich sonst machen sollte“ – Dieter Birr im Interview mit Die Tageszeitung (taz) vom 4. Februar  2017, S. 46–47.

References 

German rock singers
German rock guitarists
German rock musicians
East German musicians
Living people
People from Koszalin
1944 births
20th-century German male singers